The 24th annual Venice International Film Festival was held from 24 August to 7 September 1963.

Jury
 Arturo Lanocita (Italy) (head of jury)
 Sergei Gerasimov (Soviet Union)  
 Lewis Jacobs (USA)  
 Hidemi Kon (Japan)
 Claude Mauriac (France)
 Guido Aristarco (Italy)
 Piero Gadda Conti (Italy)

Films in competition

Awards
Golden Lion:
Hands Over the City (Francesco Rosi)
Special Jury Prize:
The Fire Within (Louis Malle)
Introduction to Life (Igor Talankin)
Volpi Cup:
 Best Actor - Albert Finney (Tom Jones)
 Best Actress - Delphine Seyrig (Muriel)
Best First Work
A Sunday in September (Jörn Donner)
Best Short Film
The War Game (Mai Zetterling)
FIPRESCI Prize
Not on Your Life (Luis García Berlanga)
OCIC Award
Hud (Martin Ritt)
Pasinetti Award
The Fire Within (Louis Malle)
Parallel Sections - Il terrorista (Gianfranco De Bosio)
Lion of San Marco - Grand Prize
Best Documentary - Mud Covered City (Václav Táborsky)

References

External links
 
 Venice Film Festival 1963 Awards on IMDb

Venice International Film Festival
Venice International Film Festival
Venice Film Festival
Film
Venice International Film Festival
Venice International Film Festival